Annampatla is a village in Yadadri district in Telangana, India. It is located in Bibinagar mandal.

References 

Villages in Yadadri Bhuvanagiri district